Ethalia nitida is a species of sea snail, a marine gastropod mollusk in the family Trochidae, the top snails.

Description
The shell of this species is thin and helicoid, with smooth and polished whorls. The inner lip is callous and indented, but the callus is not sufficiently large to cover or conceal the umbilicus. The peristome is produced into an angle, which ascends on the body whorl.

Distribution
This marine species occurs off Japan.

References

 Higo, S., Callomon, P. & Goto, Y. (1999) Catalogue and Bibliography of the Marine Shell-Bearing Mollusca of Japan. Elle Scientific Publications, Yao, Japan, 749 pp.

External links
 To World Register of Marine Species

nitida
Gastropods described in 1863